Paternalistic conservatism is a strand of conservatism, which reflects the belief that societies exist and develop organically and that members within them have obligations towards each other. There is particular emphasis on the paternalistic obligation, referencing the feudal concept of noblesse oblige, of those who are socially privileged and wealthy to the poorer parts of society. Consistent with principles such as duty, hierarchy, and organic unity, it can be seen as an outgrowth of traditionalist conservatism. Paternalistic conservatives do not support the individual or the state in principle but are instead prepared to support either or recommend a balance between the two depending on what is most practical.

Paternalistic conservatism emphasizes the duties of government to entail fairly broad state interventionism to cultivate a good life for all citizens. This leads to a dirigiste path in which the government is envisaged as a benevolent paternal figure setting goals and ensuring fair play and equal opportunity, with a stress on the importance of a social safety net to deal with poverty and support of redistribution of wealth, along with government regulation of markets in the interests of both consumers and producers. Although accepting of state intervention, paternalist conservatives are not supportive of anything resembling a command economy.

Paternalistic conservatism first arose as a result of the industrial revolution during the 19th century, which had created social unrest, appalling working conditions and inequality. In Britain, Benjamin Disraeli's one-nation conservative sought to deal with these effects. In the United Kingdom, there has been a continuation of one-nation conservative governments, such as those of Stanley Baldwin, Neville Chamberlain, Winston Churchill, and Harold Macmillan. During the 19th century in Germany, Otto von Bismarck established the first modern welfare state, with the goal of undermining socialism by gaining working-class support. He implemented policies of state-organized compulsory insurance for workers against sickness, accident, incapacity and old age as part of his State Socialism programme. Leo von Caprivi also promoted a policy called the New Course.

Origins
Paternalist conservatism has its origins in the Industrial Revolution, which had caused widespread economic inequality, poverty ,and social discontent. In Britain, Tory politicians, such as Richard Oastler, Michael Thomas Sadlerm and Lord Shaftesburym combined their elitist responsibility and a strong humanitarian element with their involvement on the Factory Acts. Critical of individualism and classical economics, they also disliked the 1834 New Poor Law and believed in the role of the state in guaranteeing decent housing, working conditions, wages and treatment of the poor.

One-nation conservatism

One-nation conservatism was first conceived in the United Kingdom by Conservative Party prime minister Benjamin Disraeli, who presented his political philosophy in two novels, Coningsby and Sybil, Or The Two Nations, published in 1844 and 1845 ,respectively. Disraeli's British conservatism proposed a paternalistic society with the social classes intact but the working class receiving support from the well off. Disraeli emphasised the importance of social obligation rather than the individualism that pervaded British society. Disraeli warned that Britain would become divided into two nations (of the rich and poor) as a result of increased industrialisation and inequality. Concerned at that division, he supported measures to improve the lives of the people to provide social support and protect the working classes.

Disraeli justified his ideas by his belief in an organic society in which the different classes have natural obligations to one another. He saw society as naturally hierarchical and emphasised the obligations of those at the top to those below. This was a continuation of the feudal concept of noblesse oblige. which asserted that the aristocracy had an obligation to be generous and honourable. To Disraeli, that implied that government should be paternalistic. One-nation conservatism identifies its approach as pragmatic and non-ideological. There is an acceptance of the need for flexible policies, and one-nation conservatives have often sought compromise with their ideological opponents for the sake of social stability. Disraeli justified his views pragmatically by arguing that should the ruling class become indifferent to the suffering of the people, society would become unstable and social revolution would become a possibility.

History

Germany 

In 1878, the German conservative and Lutheran figure Adolf Stoecker founded the Christian Social Workers' Party with intent to align workers with Protestant Christianity and the German monarchy. Stoecker respected existing social hierarchies but also desired a state that would be active in protecting the poor and vulnerable citizens. On occasion, Stoecker used antisemitic rhetoric to gain support; he urged supporters to practice Christian love even towards Jews.

As Chancellor of Germany, Otto von Bismarck pursued a state-building strategy designed to make ordinary Germans more loyal to the country, implementing the modern welfare state in Germany during the 1880s. Bismarck was fearful of a socialist revolution, and he created the first welfare state in the modern world with the goal of gaining working class support that might otherwise go to his socialist opponents. He adopted policies of state-organized compulsory insurance for workers to guard against sickness, accident, incapacity and old age in what has been named State Socialism. The term State Socialism was coined by Bismarck's German liberal opposition; it was later accepted by Bismarck. Bismarck was a conservative, not a socialist, and he enacted the Anti-Socialist Laws. Bismark's State Socialism was based upon Romanticist political thought in which the state was supreme and carried out Bismarck's agenda of supporting "the protest of collectivism against individualism" and of "nationality against cosmopolitanism" and stated that "the duty of the State is to maintain and promote the interests, the well-being of the nation as such".  Rather, his actions were designed to offset the growth of the Social Democratic Party of Germany. In addition, the policy of nationalization of the Prussian state railways was established after the unification of Germany, bringing transportation under the control of the state.

Canada 

A red Tory is an adherent of a political philosophy derived from the Tory tradition, predominantly in Canada but also in the United Kingdom. This philosophy tends to favour social policies that are communitarian, while maintaining a degree of fiscal discipline and a respect of the political order. In Canada, red Toryism is found in provincial and federal Conservative political parties. The history of red Toryism marks differences in the development of the political cultures of Canada and the United States. Canadian conservatism and American conservatism have been different from each other in fundamental ways, including their stances on social issues and the role of government in society.

Red Tory governments in Canada, such as those of John A. Macdonald, Robert Borden, R. B. Bennett, and John Diefenbaker, were known for supporting an active role for the government in the economy. This included the creation of government-owned and operated crown corporations of Canadam such as the Canadian National Railway, and the development and protection of Canadian industries with programs, such as the National Policy.

France 
In Europe, Catholic political movements emerged in the 19th century as a response to widespread deterioration of social conditions and rising anti-clerical and democratic tendencies amongst artisans and workers. It mixed social commitment, paternalistic social welfare, and authoritarian patronage from above with deepening popular piety.

In France, the influence of these doctrines can be seen in the conservative socialism of Adrien Albert Marie de Mun and François-René de La Tour du Pin Chambly, marquis de La Charce.

Japan 

During the post-war Japan, policies led by the right-wing conservative Liberal Democratic Party (LDP) became a political model closer to paternalistic democracy than Westen-style liberal democracy. In many ways, modern Japan is considered to be a paternalistic state including socially conservative elements, such as Confucian tradition. In the case of the LDP administration under the 1955 System in Japan, their degree of economic control was stronger than that of Western conservative governments; it was also positioned closer to social democracy at that time. Since the 1970s, the oil crisis has slowed economic growth and increased the resistance of urban citizens to policies that favor farmers. To maintain its dominant position, the LDP sought to expand party supporters by incorporating social security policies and pollution measures advocated by opposition parties. It was also historically closely positioned to corporate statism.

Founded in 1960, the Democratic Socialist Party (DSP) officially supported social democracy. Due to its Japanese nationalist, anti-communist, and socially conservative nature, it was politically different from ordinary social democrats and was more politically close to the right-wing LDP, and was regarded as a conservative political party in Japan at the time. While the party was disbanded in 1994, the tradition of the DSP is carried on by the Minsha kyōkai (民社協会, Democratic Socialist Group) as a faction within the liberal Democratic Party of Japan, Democratic Party, and now centre-right Democratic Party for the People.

Argentina 

Peronism is considered a paternalistic ideology. However, traditional Peronism tends to support command economy, unlike common paternalistic conservatives. Some scholars evaluate Peronism as a mixture of 'militant laborism' and 'traditional conservatism'.

United States 
In the United States, Theodore Roosevelt has been the main figure identified with progressive conservatism as a political tradition. Roosevelt stated that he had "always believed that wise progressivism and wise conservatism go hand in hand". Roosevelt's ideas, such that of New Nationalism, an extension of his earlier philosophy of the Square Deal, have been described as paternalistic and contrasted with the individualistic program, The New Freedom, of Woodrow Wilson from the Democratic Party. Wilson's program in practice has been described as resembling the more paternalistic ideas of Roosevelt, excluding the notion of reining in judges.

The Republican Party administration of William Howard Taft was progressive conservative and he described himself as "a believer in progressive conservatism", Dwight D. Eisenhower also declared himself an advocate of progressive conservatism. The term "Rockefeller Republican" has been used to describe the more paternalistic and moderate members of the Republican Party in contrast to party members of a more ideological nature, such as Barry Goldwater or the American New Right more generally.

Perspectives 

Right-wing or conservative socialism is a pejorative term that is used by some free-market conservative and right-libertarian movements, politicians, and economists, such as Murray Rothbard and Jesús Huerta de Soto, to describe paternalistic conservatism, which they see it supporting paternalism and social solidarity as opposed to commercialism, individualism, and laissez-faire economics. They argue that paternalist conservatism supports state promoted social hierarchy and allows certain people and groups to hold higher status in such a hierarchy, which is conservative. Although paternalistic conservatives are accepting of state intervention, it is within the context of a market based social democractic or social market mixed economy. They do not support an economy resembling a command or planned economy, or an economy in which there is public control over the means of production one of the stated goals of socialism. Additionally they also support equality of opportunity and fair play.

See also 

 Chiangism
 Christian democracy
 Compassionate conservatism
 Gandhian socialism
 High Tory
 Jamaica Labour Party
 Kōchikai
 National-Social Association
 Peronism
 Preussentum und Sozialismus
 Social conservatism
 Tory socialism
 Yellow socialism

References

Bibliography

Further reading 
 Eley, Geoff (1997). Society, Culture, and the State in Germany, 1870-1930 (1st paperback ed.). University of Michigan.
 Paxton, Robert O. (1975). Europe in the Twentieth Century. Harcourt Brace College Publishers.
 Paxton, Robert O.; Julie Hessler (2011) [2005]. Europe in the Twentieth Century. Belmont, California: Wadsworth Cengage Learning.
 Sternhell, Ze'ev (1986). Neither Right Nor Left: Fascist Ideology in France (2nd ed.). Princeton, New Jersey: Princeton University Press.
 Viereck, Peter (2006). Conservative Thinkers: From John Adams to Winston Churchill. New Brunswick, New Jersey: Transaction Publishers.
 Weitz, Eric D. (2007). Weimar Germany: Promise and Tragedy. Princeton, New Jersey: Princeton University Press.

External links 
 

 
Centre-right ideologies
Conservatism
Gaullism
One-nation conservatism
Right-wing ideologies
Syncretic political movements